Smithwick is an unincorporated community and census-designated place (CDP) in Fall River County, South Dakota, United States. The population was 39 at the 2020 census. Smithwick has been assigned the ZIP code of 57782.

Demographics

History
A post office called Smithwicks was established in 1887, and in 1901 the name was changed to Smithwick. Smithwick was named for a railroad engineer.

References

Unincorporated communities in Fall River County, South Dakota
Unincorporated communities in South Dakota